The Orhideea Towers, is a class A office building complex constructed in the western part of Bucharest in the vicinity of the Politehnica University of Bucharest. The construction of the building started in October 2015 and was completed in the first quarter of 2019 at a total cost of €75 million.

The original project consisted of two 20 floor buildings covering  but eventually was modified to comprise the current 17 and 13 floor buildings linked together by a skybridge. The complex is directly linked to the nearby Grozăvești metro station by a tunnel specially built for the project.

See also
List of tallest buildings in Romania

References

Skyscraper office buildings in Bucharest